Gösta Greger Stig Fabian Brunnström (4 March 1907 – 11 June 1989), was a Swedish diplomat.

Career
Brunnström, the son of director Fabian Brunnström and his wife Hildur (née Banck), was born on 4 March 1907 in Helsingborg, Sweden. He was commissioned as an officer in 1929 and was lieutenant in the Scanian Cavalry Regiment (K 2) reserve from 1932 to 1946. Brunnström received a Bachelor of Arts degree in 1932 and Candidate of Law degree from Uppsala University in 1936 before he became an attaché at the Ministry for Foreign Affairs in 1936.

Brunnström served at the consulate-general in Calcutta in 1937, was the acting consul general there in 1938, attaché in Paris in 1939, Oslo in 1940 and was second legation secretary in Washington, D.C. in 1941. He was the acting chargé d'affaires in Mexico City in 1942, legation secretary in Rio de Janeiro in 1943 and in Buenos Aires in 1944 and the first secretary at the Foreign Ministry in 1944. Brunnström was then director of the Foreign Ministry's Maritime Bureau (Utrikesdepartementets sjöfartsbyrå) 1946–48, first secretary of the mission in Washington, D.C. in 1948 and in Buenos Aires in 1949 as well as director at the Foreign Ministry in 1954. He was ambassador in Karachi 1956–60, Beirut, also accredited to Riyadh, Amman and Nicosia 1960-65 and Damascus 1961–65. Brunnström was ambassador in Athens 1965-72 and consul general in Montreal 1969–72.

Personal life
In 1943 he married Mary Davis (1917-1987), the daughter of Allen Davis and Alice Suplee. Brunnström was the owner of the Hamilton House in Helsingborg. Brunnström died on 11 June 1989 and was buried on 13 July 1989 at Pålsjö Cemetery in Helsingborg.

Awards
Knight of the Order of the Polar Star
Commander of the Order of Merit of Argentina (Orden Al Mérito)

References

1907 births
1989 deaths
Ambassadors of Sweden to Pakistan
Ambassadors of Sweden to Lebanon
Ambassadors of Sweden to Saudi Arabia
Ambassadors of Sweden to Jordan
Ambassadors of Sweden to Cyprus
Ambassadors of Sweden to Syria
Ambassadors of Sweden to Greece
Consuls-general of Sweden
People from Helsingborg
Uppsala University alumni
Knights of the Order of the Polar Star